The Three Ancient Springs (日本三古湯, Nihon San Kotō) are a group of ancient onsen in Japan. 

According to the Nihon Shoki and Fudoki, both from the eighth century, they are:

Dōgo Onsen, Ehime Prefecture
Arima Onsen, Hyōgo Prefecture
Nanki-Shirahama Onsen, Wakayama Prefecture

The tenth century Engishiki gives a slightly different list:

 Dōgo Onsen, Ehime Prefecture
 Arima Onsen, Hyōgo Prefecture
 Iwaki Yumoto Onsen, Fukushima Prefecture

Japanese culture-related lists
Bathing in Japan
Hot springs of Japan